Chembrassery  is a village in Malappuram district in the state of Kerala, India.

Demographics
 India census, Chembrassery had a population of 13466 with 6501 males and 6965 females.

Transportation
Chembrassery village connects to other parts of India through Nilambur town.  State Highway No.28 starts from Nilambur and connects to Ooty, Mysore and Bangalore through Highways.12,29 and 181. National highway No.66 passes through Ramanattukara and the northern stretch connects to Goa and Mumbai.  The southern stretch connects to Cochin and Trivandrum.   State.  The nearest airport is at Karipur.  The nearest major railway station is at Feroke.

References

Villages in Malappuram district